Pseudosedum is a genus of flowering plants in the family Crassulaceae.

Species the genus include:
 Pseudosedum acutisepalum C.-A.Jansson
 Pseudosedum affine (Schrenk) A.Berger
 Pseudosedum bucharicum Boriss.
 Pseudosedum campanuliflorum Boriss.
 Pseudosedum condensatum Boriss.
 Pseudosedum fedtschenkoanum Boriss.
 Pseudosedum ferganense Boriss.
 Pseudosedum kamelinii Palanov
 Pseudosedum karatavicum Boriss.
 Pseudosedum koelzii C.-A.Jansson
 Pseudosedum kuramense Boriss.
 Pseudosedum lievenii (Ledeb.) A.Berger
 Pseudosedum longidentatum Boriss.
 Pseudosedum multicaule (Boiss. & Buhse) Boriss.

It is an important host for the larva of the Central Asian butterfly Parnassius apollonius.

References

Crassulaceae
Crassulaceae genera
Taxa named by Alwin Berger
Taxa named by Pierre Edmond Boissier